The Sporck Battalion may refer to:

 The Sporck Battalion (1927 film), a German silent war film
 The Sporck Battalion (1934 film), a German drama film